The A2100 is a non-primary A road in East Sussex, England.  It runs from near Mountfield, East Sussex to Baldslow in the north of Hastings. It was part of the original A21 road from London to Hastings, and passes through Battle, the site of the Battle of Hastings.

Going south, the route starts at the Johns Cross roundabout near Mountfield. From this point the current route of the A21 continues south-east through Vinehall Street, Whatlington and Kent Street, while the A2100 goes more or less due south.

It initially travels through woods, and crosses the Hastings railway line at a level crossing. It later forms the main street of Battle, and then turns south-east towards Hastings, eventually meeting the A21 and the A28 at Baldslow.

Proposed Improvements

Baldslow Interchange

Roads in England
Transport in East Sussex
Hastings